The St. Johns Review is the oldest extant neighborhood newspaper in Portland, Oregon, United States. Its first issue was published on November 11, 1904 by publisher J.C. Crome.

References 

Newspapers published in Portland, Oregon
St. Johns, Portland, Oregon